Kushtagi is a panchayat town in Koppal district in the Indian state of Karnataka. Kushtagi is a taluk center of Koppal district. This taluk has a population of 353,142 as per the 2021 census estimate. In this taluk, pomegranate fruits are popularly grown.There is a Durga devi temple in heart of the town. To its North lies Ilkal, Gajendragad to the West, Hospet to the South and Sindhanur to the East. Red and black soil can be found in this taluk. A big lake 4kms away from the city is the main source of drinking water is situated in west side and covering the area of more than 300 acres

History
It has an average elevation of 639 metres (2096 feet). The area is dry and prone to drought.

Demographics
 India census, Kushtagi had a population of 21,180. Males constitute 51% of the population and females 49%. Kushtagi has an average literacy rate of 64.4
%, higher than the national average of 59.5%: male literacy is 73%, and female literacy is 55%. In Kushtagi, 14% of the population is under 6 years of age.

Registered Non-Government Organisations
Kushtagi is a major area of work for the following NGOs:
Samraksha, the HIV/AIDS unit of Samuha
Information Technology, Sankalpa Rural information Technology Development

Transport
Kushtagi is well connected by road to Bangalore, Hubli, Raichur, Bagalkot and other major cities. The nearest major airport is in Hubli.

Long-distance bus routes
Karnataka State Road Transport Corporation (KSRTC) runs a bus service to other cities and villages. There are also various private bus services.

Railways
Koppal and Hospet is the nearest railway station to Kushtagi and Koppal and Hospet is served by a major rail line and is well connected by trains to all major parts of India such as Bangalore, Mumbai, Pune, Hyderabad, and Ahmedabad.

See also
Hanumasagara
Kudalasangama
Sindhanur
Yelburga

References

Kushtagi lost village bommanhal next area will be start badami taluk Bomma

Cities and towns in Koppal district